Tommaso Dotti (born 11 July 1993) is an Italian male short track speed skater.

References

External links

Tommaso Dotti's profile, from http://www.sochi2014.com. Retrieved 14 June 2014.

1993 births
Living people
Italian male short track speed skaters
Olympic short track speed skaters of Italy
Short track speed skaters at the 2014 Winter Olympics
Short track speed skaters at the 2018 Winter Olympics
Short track speed skaters at the 2022 Winter Olympics
Olympic bronze medalists for Italy
Medalists at the 2022 Winter Olympics
Olympic medalists in short track speed skating
World Short Track Speed Skating Championships medalists
Sportspeople from Milan